Ronaldo César Mendes de Medeiros (born 16 August 1992), known as Ronaldo Mendes or simply Ronaldo, is a Brazilian footballer who plays as attacking midfielder for TFF First League club Çaykur Rizespor.

Club career

Early career
Born in Nova Erechim, Santa Catarina, Ronaldo was a Paraná Clube youth graduate, but after failing to make his breakthrough, he moved to Corinthians Alagoano in 2011. The following year, he joined CSA, and made his debut for the club on 24 June 2012 by starting and scoring a brace in a 3–1 home win against Vitória da Conquista.

Ronaldo scored four goals in a 5–0 home routing of Feirense on 12 August 2012. On 19 September, after scoring nine goals in nine matches, he signed for Série B side CRB.

Ronaldo made his professional debut on 22 September 2012, coming on as a half-time substitute and scoring his team's first in a 2–3 away loss against São Caetano. He finished the campaign with ten appearances, as his side suffered relegation.

In January 2013 Ronaldo moved to Guarani, on loan from Paraná. On 8 November, after struggling with injuries, he rescinded his contract.

On 13 December 2013 Ronaldo joined Botafogo-SP, but was released shortly after. On 1 August 2014, he signed a short-term deal with Criciúma in Série A, after being previously training with the club.

Ronaldo made his debut in the main category of Brazilian football on 17 August 2014, replacing Serginho in a 0–2 away loss against Grêmio. In September he rescinded his link, and moved to ABC.

After representing Penapolense in 2015 Campeonato Paulista, Ronaldo returned to ABC on 20 April 2015. He appeared regularly for the side, featuring in 23 matches and scoring three goals.

Santos
On 19 December 2015 Ronaldo signed a one-year deal with Santos. Initially assigned to the B-team, he was promoted to the main squad in the following month.

Ronaldo made his debut for Peixe on 6 February 2016, coming on as a second-half substitute and suffering a late penalty in a 2–1 home win against Ituano. On 10 April, again from the bench, he scored the winner in a home success over Audax for the same scoreline; he scored the equalizer against the same team in the first leg of the final, as his side was crowned champions in a 2–1 aggregate win.

Al-Wasl
On 7 July 2016, Ronaldo moved abroad for the first time in his career, joining Emirati club Al-Wasl.

Career statistics

Honours
Santos
Campeonato Paulista: 2016

References

External links
Santos FC profile 

1992 births
Living people
Sportspeople from Santa Catarina (state)
Brazilian footballers
Association football midfielders
Campeonato Brasileiro Série A players
Campeonato Brasileiro Série B players
Campeonato Brasileiro Série D players
Paraná Clube players
Sport Club Corinthians Alagoano players
Centro Sportivo Alagoano players
Clube de Regatas Brasil players
Guarani FC players
Botafogo Futebol Clube (SP) players
Criciúma Esporte Clube players
ABC Futebol Clube players
Clube Atlético Penapolense players
Santos FC players
UAE Pro League players
Al-Wasl F.C. players
Fujairah FC players
Süper Lig players
Çaykur Rizespor footballers
Brazilian expatriate footballers
Brazilian expatriate sportspeople in the United Arab Emirates
Expatriate footballers in the United Arab Emirates
Expatriate footballers in Turkey
Brazilian expatriate sportspeople in Turkey